Celso Zani, O.F.M., also Giuliano Zani (born 1580) was a Roman Catholic prelate who served as Bishop of Città della Pieve (1625–1629).

Biography
Celso Zani was born in Settimello, Italy, and ordained a priest in the Order of Friars Minor. On 3 March 1625, he was appointed by Pope Urban VIII as Bishop of Città della Pieve, where he served until his resignation in 1629.

Episcopal succession
While bishop, he served as the principal consecrator of:
Jacques Lebret, Bishop of Toul (1645);

and the principal co-consecrator of:

References

External links and additional sources
 (for Chronology of Bishops) 
 (for Chronology of Bishops)  

1580 births
17th-century Italian Roman Catholic bishops
Bishops appointed by Pope Urban VIII
Franciscan bishops